Pishva (also Romanized as Pīshvā, Pīchvā, and Pīshvah; also known as Emāmzādeh Ja‘far and Pīshyān) is a city in the Central District of Pishva County, Tehran province, Iran, and serves as capital of the county. At the 2006 census, its population was 41,480 in 10,734 households, when it was in the former Pishva District of Varamin County. The following census in 2011 counted 47,253 people in 13,352 households, by which time the district had been separated from the county and Pishva County established. The latest census in 2016 showed a population of 59,184 people in 18,054 households.

The older names of the city were Samenat and later Emamzadeh-Ja'far. The residents of Pishva are mainly Persian-speaking Shias and are predominantly descendants of the original residents of the Tehran and Ray area. Members of the Joneidi clan are the most prominent residents of the city. In Persian the word Pishva means Imam and leader and refers to  the mausoleum of Imamzadeh Ja'far, who is considered the son of the seventh Shi'ite Imam, Imam Mousa Al-Kazim.

References 

Pishva County

Cities in Tehran Province

Populated places in Tehran Province

Populated places in Pishva County